The Euharlee Covered Bridge, also known as the Euharlee Creek Covered Bridge or rarely the Lowry Bridge, is a wooden Town lattice covered bridge crossing Euharlee Creek in Euharlee, Georgia, United States, a small town west of Cartersville. The bridge was built after the raging creek swept away an old bridge on the property of Daniel Lowry. The collapse of the bridge killed one man. A new bridge was built using some materials provided by Lowry next to the mill located adjacent to the bridge site.

The bridge was built in 1886 by Horace King's son Washington King and Johnathan H. Burke. The bridge spans 138 feet. The lattice trusses consist of planks crisscrossing at 45- to 60-degree angles and are fastened with wooden pegs, or trunnels, at each intersection. Traffic stopped across the bridge in 1980 when a new two-lane bridge was built.

See also
List of covered bridges in Georgia

References

External links
 Euharlee Creek Covered Bridge historical marker

Covered bridges in Georgia (U.S. state)
Bridges completed in 1886
Buildings and structures in Bartow County, Georgia
Wooden bridges in Georgia (U.S. state)
Transportation in Bartow County, Georgia
Tourist attractions in Bartow County, Georgia
Road bridges in Georgia (U.S. state)
Lattice truss bridges in the United States
1886 establishments in Georgia (U.S. state)